Vista Caballo is a private facility located in Dove Creek, Colorado.

In 2005, Lisa Arie founded Vista Caballo, LLC, her 160-acre ranch, along with her husband Jess Arie. Described by Fast Co. magazine as the "CEO whisperer”, the former award-winning advertising executive works with horses as the instinctive catalyst to fast-forward entrepreneurs, C-suite executives, directors, managers, team leaders and individuals striving for change.

Vista Caballo is a certified B Corporation. Lisa Arie is also the author of Crossing The Silly Bridge, which was published by Vista Caballo.

Services
Vista Caballo provides custom-designed and on-line experiences. The Vista Caballo Signature Experience is designed for leaders seeking transformation. The Vista Caballo Signature Experience helps participants to step outside known comfort zones and propel them forward with focus. A four-week interactive web experience combines all the fundamental principles uncovered during their stay at Vista Caballo, so participants can continue their evolution at home.

Vista Caballo also provides custom-designed engagements for corporate leaders off-site to create tipping points for self-actualization.

Executives
Lisa Arie, Co-founder/CEO
Jess Arie, Co-founder

References

External links
 VistaCaballo.com Official site
 Vista Caballo on YouTube

Companies established in 2005